"What I Need" is a song by American singer-songwriter Hayley Kiyoko featuring artist Kehlani. It was released as a single on May 31, 2018, along with an accompanying music video.

Music video
A music video, directed by Kiyoko, was released concurrently with the single. As of April 2021, the video has garnered over 32 million views.

References

External links
 

2018 songs
2018 singles
Atlantic Records singles
Empire Distribution singles
Hayley Kiyoko songs
Kehlani songs
LGBT-related songs
Songs written by Kehlani